Al Melvin may refer to:

Allan Melvin (1923–2008), American character actor
Al Melvin (politician) (born 1944), member of the Arizona State Senate